CKBK-FM is a low-power FM radio station which broadcasts a First Nations community radio programming on the frequency 104.3 MHz in Thamesville, Ontario, Canada.

Owned by Lenape Community Radio Society, the station received Canadian Radio-television and Telecommunications Commission (CRTC) approval on April 14, 2011.

The station began testing on January 30, 2012, and officially launched in April 2012.

Technical issues
Since the newly launched Thamesville station operates at 104.3 MHz with only 50 watts, there are possibilities that the new First Nations community radio station may receive co-channel interference from a significantly much higher powered 190,000-watt FM radio station, WOMC, which operates at 104.3 MHz from its transmitter in Ferndale, Michigan.

References

External links
Homepage of the Lenape (Delaware) Nation, includes information on CKBK-FM
 

KBK
KBK
Radio stations established in 2012
2012 establishments in Ontario